The following is lists of Iranian films scheduled to be released in 2020s.

2020

2021

January–March

April–June

July – September

October–December

2022

January–March

April–June

July – September

October–December

2023

January–March

References

External links
 Iranian film at the Internet Movie Database

2020s
Iranian
Films